Varaphalam is a 1994 Indian Malayalam-language comedy-drama film directed by Thaha and written by B. Jayachandran, starring Sreenivasan and Mukesh in the lead roles.

Plot

The story is about Thilakan and his two sons, one of them blind, Unni (Sreenivasan), and the other one deaf, Balan (Mukesh).The story takes a turn when the sons marry and their in-laws try to steal the family money. Krishnankutty (Jagathy) is a clever but honest caretaker for the deaf and blind siblings, who is constantly at odds with their in-laws. Being astute he senses the actual intentions of the in laws and warns the brothers. His run-ins with the in-laws give some genuine comic moments. The in laws start wading into forbidden territory in their quest to grab money finally The father (Thilakan), steps in and carries out the burden of sorting things out.

Cast
 Sreenivasan as Unni
 Mukesh as Balan
 Thilakan as Sreedharan Nair (Father of Unni and Balan)
 Maathu as Balan's wife (Anjali)
 Anju as Unni's wife (Geetha)
 Jagathy Sreekumar as Krishnankutty
 Paravoor Bharathan as Pillai Chettan
 Karamana Janardanan Nair as Geetha's father
 Janardhanan as Govindankutty
 Mamukkoya as broker Hamsa
 Meena as Geetha's mother
 Siddique as Gopi/Drama Artist (Cameo Appearance)
 Sukumari as Kalyanikutty/Drama Artist Rosy (Cameo Appearance)
 Zeenath as Govindankutty's Wife
 K. P. A. C. Sunny as Sahadevan
 Mala Aravindan as Advocate Arunkumar
 Indrans as Auto Driver
 Zainuddin
 Kalasala Babu
 Elias Babu as Man at Bus stop
 Abu Salim

References

External links
 

1990s Malayalam-language films
Films scored by Mohan Sithara
1994 comedy films
1994 films